Maran (also spelled Marran) is a town in northern Syria, in the west of the Al-Bab District of Aleppo Governorate, about halfway between the cities of Al-Bab and Aleppo. On 22 January 2017, Maran was captured by Government forces.

References 

Populated places in al-Bab District